The obscure emo skink (Emoia obscura) is a species of lizard in the family Scincidae. It is found in Papua New Guinea.

References

Emoia
Reptiles described in 1927
Reptiles of Papua New Guinea
Endemic fauna of Papua New Guinea
Taxa named by Jan Komelis De Jong
Skinks of New Guinea